

Sandfontein Nature Reserve 
{
  "type": "FeatureCollection",
  "features": [
    {
      "type": "Feature",
      "properties": {},
      "geometry": {
        "type": "Point",
        "coordinates": [
          18.572387695312504,
          -28.738763971370293
        ]
      }
    }
  ]
}Sandfontein is a private property comprising 95,000 hectares in the ǁKaras Region of Namibia. The Battle of Sandfontein was fought at Sandfontein on 26 September 1914. The Battle of Norechab was fought in 1906.  Today Sandfontein forms part of the wider Sandfontein nature reserve spanning more than 80,000 hectares and featuring some 25 kilometres of Orange River frontage.

Sandfontein is home to more than 4,000 animals including the leopard, cheetah, kudu, eland, zebra, giraffe, red hartebeest, springbok, ostrich, jackal, aardvark, caracal, and baboon.

Geography of ǁKaras Region
Nature reserves in Namibia

Amethyst Mine 
Pale to dark amethyst quartz was mined sporadically on Girtis farm prior to the major finds of the late 1990s.

References